is a Japanese pop singer and former member for Japanese girl group Morning Musume. She is now a TV talent and planning to debut as an actress.

History

Morning Musume and Hello Project
Joined the girl group Morning Musume in 1998. She, along with Mari Yaguchi and Kei Yasuda, formed the second generation of members. While in Morning Musume, Sayaka Ichii was put into the spin-off group, Petitmoni with Maki Goto and Kei Yasuda . Ichii was also part of the Hello Project! Summer Shuffles 2000 group Aoiro 7. She also recorded a folk song album with Yuko Nakazawa.
She left Morning Musume in May to continue her education.

After Morning Musume
Sayaka Ichii graduated from Morning Musume and Hello! Project after the single "Happy Summer Wedding" in 2000. A year after she left, she formed the group Ichii Sayaka in Cubic-Cross, trio with Taisei (keyboardist from Sharan Q), and wrote two of their songs. In 2003, Cubic-Cross disbanded, and after a solo single
She retired from the music business at the end of the year.
In February, she joined Ranves Management agency.on August 30, she returned to TV in a TBS show called Sunday Japan.

Personal life
Ichii announced in 2004 that she was pregnant and was to marry the group's guitarist, Naoki Yoshizawa. The couple had two daughters but divorced in 2011. Ichii later remarried and gave birth to her son. her fourth baby was born in 2017.

Discography and releases

Albums 
Duet with Yuko Nakazawa
 Folk Songs (November 29, 2001)

Ichii Sayaka in Cubic-Cross
 C:BOX (November 20, 2002)

Singles 
Sayaka Ichii in Cubic-Cross
 Jinsei Ga Mou Hajimatteru (April 24, 2002)
 Shitsuren Love Song (July 17, 2002)
 Todoke! Koi no Telepathy (November 9, 2002)
 Zutto Zutto (May 1, 2003)

Sayaka Ichii
 4U ~Hitasura~ (September 3, 2003)

DVD
 Folk Days (February 28, 2002)

Photobooks 
 Self (February 10, 2002)

External links
 Up-Front Works Official Discography Entry (Japanese)
 Sayaka Ichii's Blog (Japanese)

1983 births
Living people
Morning Musume members
Petitmoni members
People from Funabashi
Japanese women singers
Japanese women pop singers
Japanese child singers
Japanese idols
Japanese female idols
Japanese female models
Musicians from Chiba Prefecture